This Just In is an American teen sitcom that aired on Pop from December 10, 2016 to November 24, 2017.

Plot summary

Elizabeth Stanton stars as a socially repressed teenager who arrives at a new school and falls quickly into a group of rather eclectic friends each with their own issues. They each find that they have a unique bond all centering around the school's television and social media channels.

Cast
 Elizabeth Stanton as Liz Sandler
 Kristos Andrews as Tyler
 Rob Pinkston as Rob
 Wyntergrace Williams as Becca
 Jesse LeBeau as Joe
 Ashlee Macropoulos as Cassie
 Brett Pierce as Rex
 Sheridan Pierce as Martha
 Jennifer Veal as Abby
 Donn Stewart as Banana Boy

Episodes

Reception

U.S. ratings

References

External links

2016 American television series debuts
2017 American television series endings
2010s American high school television series
2010s American teen sitcoms
English-language television shows
Television series about teenagers
Television series about social media
Television series by Associated Television International
Pop (American TV channel) original programming